British Peruvians are Peruvians of British descent. The phrase may refer to someone born in Peru of  British descent. Among European Peruvians, the British were the fifth largest group of immigrants to settle in the country after the Spanish, Germans, Italians, the Swiss or/and the French.

History 
Between 1860 and 1950 it is estimated that around 1900 British settled in Peru. The regions from which most of the British immigrants originated were Southampton and London, as well as Birmingham and Liverpool.

In 1872, the European Immigration Society was founded in Peru. Its objective was promoting Old World immigration by covering the costs of their journeys and financially supporting them during their first settler years in Peru.

They mostly interacted with fellow British immigrants, and were usually relatively skilled at a trade. Many of them intermarried and at the beginning they were united, but as time passed many of them broke the circle. The British corporations owned many Chile saltpeter mines in the Tacna region of Peru during World War I when the territory was ruled by Chile. 

Many British Peruvians left the nation in 1960s and 1970s to flee from excessive poverty. Others fled in response to the left-wing dictatorship of Gen. Juan Velasco Alvarado and most of these moved to United States, United Kingdom and Spain, while most of the rest to Canada, Australia and New Zealand. The second wave of British Peruvians left during the first Alan García regime that led Peru to extreme poverty, hyperinflation and terrorism.

Cultural legacy
Inca Kola was invented by an English immigrant. In 1911, in Rímac, one of Lima's oldest and most traditional neighborhoods, an immigrant English family began a small bottling company under their family name, Lindley. In 1928, the company was formally chartered in Peru as Corporación José R. Lindley S.A., whereupon Joseph R. Lindley became its first General Manager.

Notable people 

Guillermo Billinghurst, 31st President of Peru
Nicolás Lindley López, 56th President of Peru
Alberto Elmore Fernández de Córdoba, former Prime Minister of Peru
Guillermo Larco Cox, former Prime Minister of Peru
Jaime Thorne León, former Minister of Defense of Peru
Ricardo Letts Colmenares, Peruvian politician
Juan Guillermo More, Peruvian navy officer
Isaac Lindley, Peruvian businessman
Manuel Delgado Parker, Peruvian entrepreneur
Carlos Fitzcarrald, Peruvian rubber baron
Juan Luis Cipriani Thorne, Cardinal Priest and Archbishop of Lima
Juan Landázuri Ricketts, Cardinal Priest and Archbishop of Lima
Rafael Larco Hoyle, Peruvian archaeologist
Luis Miró Quesada Garland, Peruvian architect and professor
Alfredo Bryce, Peruvian writer
Jaime Bayly, Peruvian writer, journalist and television personality
Doris Gibson, Peruvian magazine writer and publisher
Jason Day, Peruvian actor
Diego Bertie, Peruvian actor
Mónica Santa María, Peruvian model and TV hostess
Ramón Mifflin, former Peruvian football player
Diego Penny, Peruvian footballer
George Forsyth, Peruvian footballer
 Pablo Gutiérrez Weselby – Peruvian politician and former mayor of Chorrillos.

British Peruvian institutions and associations 
Cámara de Comercio Peruano-Británica
Newton College
Colegio San Andrés
Markham College
San Silvestre School
Colegio Anglo Americano Prescott
Colegio Peruano-Británico
Hiram Bingham School
Asociación Cultural Peruano-Británica
Teatro Británico de Lima
Asociación de descendientes Británicos en Perú
Asociación Escocia-Perú
Asociación Británico-Peruano
Anglo-Peruvian Society
Phoenix Club

References 

Ethnic groups in Peru
 
Peru
European Peruvian